Geikie Gorge (known locally as Darngku) is a feature of the Napier Range and is located within the grounds of Danggu Gorge National Park (formerly, Geikie Gorge National Park),  from Fitzroy Crossing,  northeast of Perth and  east of Broome in the Kimberley region of Western Australia. Believed to be one of the best-known and most easily accessed, the gorge is named in honour of Sir Archibald Geikie, the Director General of Geological Survey for Great Britain and Ireland when it was given its European name in 1883.

Along with Tunnel Creek and Windjana Gorge, Geikie Gorge is part of an ancient barrier reef that developed during the Devonian Period. The walls of the gorge are 30 metres high. The eight kilometer gorge was created by the flowing waters of the Fitzroy River, which still flows through the region. Freshwater crocodiles, Leichhardt's sawfish and coach-whip stingrays inhabit the river.

References

Watercourses of Western Australia
Kimberley (Western Australia)
Canyons and gorges of Western Australia